The California Democrat is an American weekly newspaper published in California, Missouri. It is owned by WEHCO Media, Inc.

References

External links

Official web site
WEHCO Media website

Newspapers published in Missouri
Moniteau County, Missouri